Owen Williams (20 June 1847 – 18 November 1917) was an Australian cricketer. He played four first-class cricket matches for Victoria between 1871 and 1876. He also played in one first-class match for Wellington 1884/85.

See also
 List of Victoria first-class cricketers

References

External links
 

1847 births
1917 deaths
Australian cricketers
Victoria cricketers
Wellington cricketers